General Sir Frank Ernest Wallace Simpson,  (21 March 1899 – 28 July 1986) was a senior British Army officer during the 1940s.

Military career
Born on 21 March 1899, Simpson was educated at Bishop Cotton Boys' School, Bedford School, Trinity Hall, Cambridge, and at the Royal Military Academy, Woolwich. He was commissioned into the Royal Engineers in 1916. He served in the First World War in France and Belgium in 1918 and then after the war went to Afghanistan and the North West Frontier of India and attended the Staff College, Camberley from 1931 to 1932.

Simpson also served in the Second World War, initially in France and Belgium with the British Expeditionary Force and was involved in the defence of Arras and then the Dunkirk evacuation in 1940. He became Chief of Staff to Lieutenant General Bernard Montgomery in 1940 and then Deputy Director of Military Operations at the War Office in 1942 being promoted to Director of Military Operations in 1943.

After the war Simpson became Assistant Chief of the Imperial General Staff for Operations in 1945 and then Vice Chief of Imperial General Staff in 1946. In this role he fought cut-backs in the size of the army.

In 1948 Simpson was appointed General Officer Commanding-in-Chief Western Command and in 1952 he became Commandant of the Imperial Defence College: he retired in 1954. He was made Colonel of the Royal Pioneer Corps from 1950 to 1961.

Retirement
In retirement Simpson became an advisor to the West Africa Committee, a body formed to promote British business interests in West Africa. He was a deputy lieutenant for Essex from 1956 and was Governor of the Royal Hospital Chelsea from 1961 to 1969.

References

Bibliography

External links
Generals of World War II

|-
 

|-

|-

|-

1899 births
1986 deaths
Bishop Cotton Boys' School alumni
People educated at Bedford School
Alumni of Trinity Hall, Cambridge
Graduates of the Royal Military Academy, Woolwich
Royal Engineers officers
Knights Grand Cross of the Order of the British Empire
Knights Commander of the Order of the Bath
Companions of the Distinguished Service Order
British Army personnel of World War I
British Army generals of World War II
Graduates of the Staff College, Camberley
Deputy Lieutenants of Essex
War Office personnel in World War II